"Karma" is a story written by Indian writer Khushwant Singh. It was originally published in 1989 in Singh's The Collected Stories. Karma is about an Indian "Gentleman" who tries to adopt upper class English culture and lifestyle through methods such as speaking the "Queen's English", neglecting his Indian wife, and reading English newspapers.

Theme
The story Karma illustrates the famous proverb "Pride Comes Before a Fall". It is the story of an arrogant person who feels bad about his country's culture, lifestyle etc. He is condescending to his wife because she is an ordinary woman unable to appreciate his aristocratic English culture.
Others are:
Imitation of foreign culture,
Unhappy married life,
Contrast of culture and life-style,
Aristocracy and patriotism.

Plot
Mohan Lal is a middle-aged man who works in the British Raj. He is ashamed to be an Indian and hence he speaks in English and, rarely, in Anglicized Hindustani and dresses up as a high-ranked British official. By doing English crosswords, wearing Balliol ties, and drinking scotch in public, he tries proves himself to be a proper Englishmen to English officers. His wife Lachmi is a traditional Indian woman, and he seems himself as superior to her.

The plot occurs on while Mohan Lal and Lachmi are on a train. He makes Lachmi sit in the general compartment while he sits in first class, which was meant for the British. There, he meets two British soldiers who verbally abuse him and demand that he is kicked out of first class, despite his efforts to prove himself as English. When the Mohan Lal opposes them, he is thrown out of the train. He could only look through the rails on the moving train.

Characters
 Sir Mohan Lal - An arrogant middle-aged man
 Lady Lal (Lachmi) - An ordinary Indian woman who wants to be the wife of Mohan Lal and loves to chew on Betel Leaves
 A bearer - He is carrying out Sir Mohan's orders for a drink and installs his luggage in the first-class coupe.
 A porter - He is found in the railway station carrying the luggage of Lachmi.
 Two British soldiers, Bill and Jim.

Tone and style of narration
KARMA by Khushwant Singh presents a relevant topic in the typical humorous way . The style of narration used by the author is third person omniscient limited to Sir Mohan Lal at first, then his wife Lachmi, then Sir Mohan, then Lachmi, which gives the reader a better perspective.

References

 
 The education of Sir Mohan Lal: on Khushwant Singh's "Karma." - K. Narayana Chandran

Indian short stories
1989 short stories